The Lewis and Clark Range,  el. , is a small mountain range southwest of Seeley Lake, Montana in Powell County, Montana.

See also
 List of mountain ranges in Montana

Notes

Mountain ranges of Montana
Landforms of Powell County, Montana